The following lists events that happened during 1995 in the Grand Duchy of Luxembourg.

Incumbents
 Grand Duke – Jean
 Prime Minister – Jacques Santer (to 20 January)  Jean-Claude Juncker
 Deputy Prime Minister – Jacques Poos
 President of the Chamber of Deputies – Erna Hennicot-Schoepges  Jean Spautz
 President of the Council of State – Paul Beghin
 Mayor of Luxembourg City – Lydie Polfer

Events

January – March
 1 January – Luxembourg City becomes European City of Culture for 1995.
 20 January – Jacques Santer resigns his position as Prime Minister.  He take up his new post as President of the European Commission three days later.  Jean-Claude Juncker takes Santer's place.
 26 January – Jean-Claude Juncker forms a new government, with Jacques Poos as his deputy.
 22 February – At football, Luxembourg beats Malta 1–0, recording Luxembourg's first victory in international football since 1980.
 26 March – The Schengen Agreement comes into force.

April – June
 25 May – CS Grevenmacher and Jeunesse Esch draw in the final of the Luxembourg Cup, 1-1 after extra time, forcing the game to go to a replay.
 7 June – The national football team shocks the Czech Republic by winning 1–0 in the qualifying round of the 1996 European Championship: a competition in which the Czechs would reach the final.
 11 June – CS Grevenmacher win the Luxembourg Cup, beating Jeunesse Esch 3–2 in the replay.
 11 June – Switzerland's Rolf Järmann wins the 1995 Tour de Luxembourg.
 21 June - The A3 motorway extension from Croix de Gasperich to Bonnevoie, in Luxembourg City, opens.
 July – The A13 motorway extension from Biff to Rodange, bypassing Pétange, opens.

July – September
 31 July – A law is passed giving the go-ahead to the construction of the Liaison avec le Sarre, extending the A13 to the German border.
 6 September – The national football team again beats Malta 1–0.  This would be the last Luxembourgian international victory until 2007.
 11 September - Raid on warehouse results in the largest bust of an illegal LSD producing factory in Europe to date.

October – December
 13 October – The National Literature Centre opens in Mersch.
 19 October – SES launches its fifth satellite, Astra 1E.

Deaths
 18 January – Roger Gilson, cyclist
 2 May – Albert Bousser, politician

Footnotes

 
Years of the 20th century in Luxembourg
Luxembourg